XHPGAN-FM is a radio station on 99.1 FM in Apatzingán, Michoacán. It is owned by Capital Media and known as Lokura FM with a Spanish adult hits format.

History
XHPGAN was awarded in the IFT-4 radio auction of 2017. Tecnoradio had been one of two winning bidders for two stations in the lot (the other was Media FM, which started XHPAPM-FM 100.9), but the company was later disqualified nationwide. The only other bidder on the frequency, Capital Media, had signed up to be eligible to win stations if other bidders were disqualified and came away with the Apatzingán station for 640,000 pesos. The station came to air on September 12, 2020.

References

Radio stations in Michoacán
Radio stations established in 2020
2020 establishments in Mexico